Mylakkadu is a small suburban village and junction in the Kollam district of the Kerala state in India. It is near the town Kottiyam.

References

Cities and towns in Kollam district
Villages in Kollam district